is a male freestyle wrestler from Japan.

He won a bronze medal at the 2003 FILA Wrestling World Championships.  During the Men's freestyle (66 kg) event at the 2004 Summer Olympics he was ranked on 5th place. He participated in Men's freestyle (66 kg) event at the 2008 Summer Olympics. He was eliminated from the tournament after he lost to Otar Tushishvili.

Awards
Tokyo Sports
Wrestling Special Award (2003)

References

External links
 
 
 

Living people
1979 births
Japanese male sport wrestlers
Olympic wrestlers of Japan
Wrestlers at the 2008 Summer Olympics
Wrestlers at the 2004 Summer Olympics
Sportspeople from Fukuoka (city)
Nippon Sport Science University alumni
Wrestlers at the 2002 Asian Games
World Wrestling Championships medalists
Asian Games competitors for Japan
20th-century Japanese people
21st-century Japanese people